Juwann Winfree (born September 4, 1996) is an American football wide receiver who is a free agent. He played college football at Colorado, and was drafted by the Denver Broncos in the sixth round of the 2019 NFL Draft.

College career
Winfree first began his college career at the University of Maryland, where as a freshman, he finished the 2014 season with 158 receiving yards on 6 receptions. He was dismissed from the team due to an undisclosed code of conduct violation. He admitted to Coffeyville Community College for the 2015 season. After a year at Coffeyville, Winfree transferred to the University of Colorado. He did not play in 2016 due to a torn ACL he suffered from earlier off-season workouts. In 2017, he made his first NCAA appearance in three years, finishing the year with 325 receiving yards. During an injury-riddled 2018 season, he finished with 324 receiving yards.

College statistics

Professional career

Denver Broncos
Winfree was drafted by the Denver Broncos in the sixth round (187th overall) of the 2019 NFL Draft. He played in three games before being placed on injured reserve on December 14, 2019.

On September 5, 2020, Winfree was waived by the Broncos.

Green Bay Packers
On October 1, 2020, Winfree was signed to the Green Bay Packers practice squad. He was elevated to the active roster on November 14 and December 12 for the team's weeks 10 and 14 games against the Jacksonville Jaguars and Detroit Lions, and reverted to the practice squad after each game. On January 26, 2021, Winfree signed a reserves/futures contract with the Packers.
On August 31, 2021, Packers released Winfree as part of their final roster cuts. He was signed to the practice squad the next day. He was elevated to the active roster on October 16, 2021, for the game against the Chicago Bears, in which he played 2 snaps, but finished a game without a target. He was reverted back to practice squad next day. He was elevated to the active roster again on October 28 ahead of a Week 8 game against the Arizona Cardinals, during which he recorded his first NFL catch, a 12-yard pass from Aaron Rodgers. He finished the game with four catches for 30 yards. He was elevated to the active roster again on November 20 ahead of a Week 11 game against the Minnesota Vikings. On December 14, 2021, the Packers signed Winfree to their active roster. He was waived on August 30, 2022, and signed to the practice squad two days later. He was elevated from the practice squad to the active roster on September 10, 2022. He was elevated from the practice squad to the active roster on September 24, 2022. He was elevated from the practice squad to the active roster on October 15, 2022.  His practice squad contract with the team expired after the season on January 8, 2023.

NFL career statistics

Regular season

Postseason

Personal life
Winfree graduated from Academies @ Englewood, a magnet sibling school to Dwight Morrow High School in Englewood, New Jersey. He received a "Key to the City" of Englewood from Mayor Michael Wildes on June 23, 2019, during an event at which his father announced the formation of Team Winfree Youth Foundation, a nonprofit that will host low-cost camps for football, soccer, and basketball, as well as leadership conferences for area youth.

References

External links
Green Bay Packers bio
Colorado Buffaloes bio

1996 births
Living people
People from Englewood, New Jersey
Players of American football from New Jersey
Sportspeople from Bergen County, New Jersey
American football wide receivers
Maryland Terrapins football players
Colorado Buffaloes football players
Denver Broncos players
Green Bay Packers players